Professor Tahir Mamman OON, SAN is a Senior advocate of Nigeria (SAN). Educational administrator and the Director-general of the Nigeria Law School from 2005 to 2013. He was the pioneer Head of Nigeria Law school Kano which is the First law school established in Northern Nigeria. He is a recognized member of the Body of Benchers. In 2010 he became a board member of the International Association of Law Schools based in Washington DC. In September 2015, he was conferred as a senior advocate of Nigeria(SAN). In recognition of his efforts, the Federal Government bestowed him with the national honour of Officer of the Order of the Niger(OON).  He assumed office as the vice chancellor of Baze University Abuja and Professor of constitutional law since 2018 being the second vice chancellor of the institution and first Nigerian to head the University since it establishment. He was Dean student affairs been responding for the welfare and wellbeing of over 40, 000 students. and subsequently Dean of Law at the University of Maiduguri, Borno state Nigeria from 1995 to 2001.  He holds a chieftains titles of Dan Ruwata Adamawa Emirate and Dokajin Mubi of Adamawa state.

Professor Tahir Mamman joined party politics in 2014 after completing his meritorious tenure as DG, CEO of the Council of legal education, The Nigeria Law School. He contested for Adamawa state Governorship election on the platform of the APC in December 2014 along with three other Aspirants but endorsed the consensus candidate. He went on to campaign for the victory of Muhammadu Buhari in the 2015 general election as one of the senior coordinators in the Buhari campaign organisation. He was a Member representing the northeast geopolitical zone in the National Caretaker/Extraordinary Convention Planning Committee of the APC as well as the Chairman of the 7 man  Constitution review committee inaugurated by the chairman of the (CECPC) the Governor of Yobe state Mai Mala Buni. He later on was appointed acting national secretary of the APC when Governor Abubakar Sani Bello of Niger state assumed office as Acting National chairman of the party. The APC is the ruling political party in Nigeria.

Early life and education 
Mamman was born in 1954 at Michika in Adamawa State. He holds a LL.B degree at the Ahmadu Bello University in 1983 and call to the bar in the Nigerian Law School in 1984. He earned his masters from the University of Warwick England in 1987 and his PhD in 1990 University of Warwick, Warwickshire England.

Career 
He began lecturing at the University of Maiduguri in the Faculty of Law and rose to become the Dean in the Faculty of Law. Mamman had served as judiciary in Adamawa State from 1974 to 1984, head of department common law in 1991 at the University of Maiduguri to 1997 and member of National Universities Commission, member of Local Government Election Tribunal, Adamawa State in 1997, he was the students affairs dean in the University of Maiduguri from 1997 to 2000 and was adviser part time consultant in the State House of Assembly of Adamawa, Yobe and Borno State from 1999 to 2000. He was also steering member committee of the establishment of Adamawa State University, external examiner at the Ahmadu Bello University from 2001 to 2002 and patron for Youth Federation of Nigeria and Nigeria Youth Organization of University of Maiduguri. He became the deputy director of Nigeria Law School Kano campus from 2001 to 2005 prior to become the Director General.

He is a member of the Body of benchers, Council of legal education, Nigerian Bar Association, Nigerian Association Of Law Teacher, Commonwealth Legal Education Association, Centre for Computer Assisted Legal Instruction USA, national association of vice chancellors of Nigeria, United Kingdom Centre for Legal Education, African Network of Constitutional Lawyers, International Bar Association, Body of senior advocates of Nigeria (BOSAN) and member Governing Board of International Association of Law School Washington DC from 2011 to 2013.

Publication 

 The law and politics of constitution-making in Nigeria, 1862–1989 issues, interests and compromises. Maiduguri, ed; Ed-Linform Services, Tahir Mamman, con; Heaney N, Mamman M, Tahir H, Al-Gharib A. Lin C. 1998 Nigeria Constitutional law,  Unique ID: 7493122309
 The law and politics of constitution making in Nigeria, 1900–1989 issues, interests and compromises. 1991, Ph.D, University of Warwick, Law Politics and political science. Tahir Mamman, Academic theses,

Notes 

1954 births
Nigerian academic administrators
Ahmadu Bello University alumni
Alumni of the University of Warwick
Nigerian Law School alumni
Senior Advocates of Nigeria
20th-century Nigerian lawyers
21st-century Nigerian lawyers
Living people